Halli Airport  is a military airport located in Kuorevesi, Jämsä, Finland,  west of Jämsä town centre. The Aircraft and Weapon Systems Training Wing of the Finnish Air Force was based at the airport until the end of the year 2013, when it was disbanded. The Hallinportti Aviation Museum is located near the airport.

Statistics

See also 
List of the largest airports in the Nordic countries

References

External links 
 AIP Finland – Halli Airport
 
 

Airports in Finland
Airport
Finnish Air Force bases
Buildings and structures in Central Finland